Danny Ongais (May 21, 1942 – February 26, 2022) was an American racing driver.

Ongais was the only native Hawaiian to compete in the Indianapolis 500. He competed professionally in motorcycle, sports car, CART, IndyCar, Formula One, and drag racing. A fearless figure on the racing circuit, Ongais was nicknamed "On-Gas" and "The Flyin' Hawaiian."

In the 1960s he won multiple drag racing championships and was named one of the National Hot Rod Association’s Top 50 Drivers for 1951-2000.  In the 1970s he moved to competing in sports cars and Indy cars, winning races in both types, including the 24 Hours of Daytona in 1979 and several Indy car races in 1977 and 1978.  He also raced in Formula One, in 1977-78, in six Grands Prix, recording a best result of seventh. 

He was known as a fast and daring driver, but he experienced multiple crashes in his career, some resulting in injury.  At the 1981 Indianapolis 500, he was involved in a near-fatal accident that caused him to miss almost a year of racing.

In 1996, at the age of 54, after nine years away from racing, he served as the substitute driver in the Indianapolis 500 for Scott Brayton, who had died in a crash before the race. Starting last, Ongais finished 7th in what was his final 500.

He was inducted into the Motorsports Hall of Fame of America in 2000 and the Hawaii Sports Hall of Fame in 2001.

Early life and career
Ongais was born in Kahului, Hawaii, on May 21, 1942. When he was aged 14, he tested out motorbike racing with some success. In the late 1950s, Ongais enlisted in the United States Army as a paratrooper stationed in Europe. He was later discharged and returned to Hawaii for motor racing. Ongais became the Hawaiian motorcycle champion in 1960 and was in the top three positions in the expert class from 1960 to 1962.

In the early 1960s he started competing in drag racing. He won the American Hot Rod Association AA Gas Dragster Championship in 1963 and 1964, and in the National Hot Rod Association AA Dragster championship title in 1965. He defeated Don Prudhomme at the 1966 HHRA Nationals Top Fuel semifinals. In 1969 he won the NHRA Spring Nationals and NHRA U.S. Nationals in the Funny Car class driving a Ford Mustang for Mickey Thompson.

1970s
Ongais moved into circuit racing in the 1970s, working his way up the ranks in American racing through SCCA road racing with the help of Ted Field. Eventually progressing through regional series and Formula 5000, Ongais and Field moved to USAC and Indy cars in 1976 under the banner of Interscope Racing. His first Indy car race was the 1976 California 500 at Ontario Motor Speedway, where he finished 28th after a crash.

In 1977, Ongais ran his first full season in Indy cars. He had a 7th at Ontario and 5th at Phoenix and then he won his first Indy car race at Michigan International Speedway.  He qualified well over the season, earning three poles, and he finished 12th in the standings.

That year he also ventured into Formula One with the Interscope team, entering the U.S. and Canadian Grands Prix at the end of the season in a year-old Penske PC4.  He crashed out on a wet track at Watkins Glen after moving up early but managed a 7th place in Canada in what would be his best finish in F1.

In 1978, his most successful year in Indy car racing, Ongais won five more races, at Ontario Motor Speedway, Texas World Speedway, Mosport, the Milwaukee Mile, and again at Michigan. He also won eight poles in qualifying. The 1978 Michigan victory would turn out to be the final Indy car victory of Ongais' career. Although Ongais won more Indy car races than any other driver that year, a combination of mechanical problems and low finishes in other races meant he would only finish 8th in the 1978 USAC Indy car championship. Still, those five wins—three on the large superspeedways at Ontario, Texas, and Michigan, one at the short Milwaukee Mile oval, and one road race at Mosport—demonstrated Ongais' versatility as a driver.

In 1978 he also made one final attempt at F1. He entered the season with the Ensign team, in a year-old N177 chassis, and retired in Argentina and Brazil with brake problems.  Interscope then bought a new Shadow chassis for him to race but he was unable to qualify at Long Beach and also in the Netherlands later in the season.

Throughout the decade, and indeed throughout the remainder of his driving career, Ongais and Field continued driving sports cars successfully, mainly in IMSA Camel GT competition. The highlight of their sports car endeavours during this time was a victory in the 1979 24 Hours of Daytona, with Ongais and Field sharing their Interscope Porsche 935 with Hurley Haywood.

CART career
Ongais made his CART debut during the 1979 season driving the #25 Panasonic/Interscope Racing Parnelli 6C-Cosworth DFX.
He first raced at the Arizona Republic/Jimmy Bryan 150 at Phoenix International Raceway where he qualified 4th and led for several laps only to drop out after 128 laps due to engine problems. He then competed at the Gould Twin Dixie 125 however bad luck hit Ongais in both races.
At the Indianapolis 500 Ongais crashed in practice and this put Ongais in jeopardy of not being able to compete. Ongais qualified 27th and finished 4th. As the season progressed the Parnelli 6C (which was already a two-year-old car) started to struggle due to its age. Ongais scored another 4th-place finish at the Kent Oil 150 at Watkins Glen International and finished in 6th place in points.

For the 1980 season Interscope was intending to use their own chassis with a Porsche V6 engine. The car was disallowed and Interscope brought out their Parnelli 6C-Cosworth DFX.
At his first race of the season, the Indianapolis 500 Ongais started 16th and finished 7th. Ongais endured a tough season highlighted by a 3rd-place finish at Watkins Glen.
Ongais also made a single start for AMI Racing driving the #43 Armstrong Mould Orbiter 80C-Cosworth DFX at the Michigan 400 at Michigan International Speedway, finishing 11th. Ongais ended the season in 15th place in points.

In 1981 at the Indianapolis 500 Danny Ongais was involved in a very serious accident on lap 63. Ongais came into the pits on lap 63 as the leader of the race, but problems during the stop caused it to drag on for a disastrous 46 seconds. After finally leaving the pits, Ongais approached a slower car at the end of the backstretch. He made a late pass going into turn 3. Carrying too much speed out of the turn, the car drifted out into the grey and the back end began to slide. Ongais tried to correct the slide by turning right, and the car hooked to the right and crashed nearly head-on into the wall. He was knocked unconscious by the heavy impact. Officials had to cut open the car to help Ongais out. He was transported by an ambulance to a nearby hospital in a critical condition. By the time the broadcasting of the race ended at 11:30 PM, Ongais's condition had improved and his condition was updated to stable. He suffered a concussion, compound fractures in both legs, a broken arm and a 6-inch tear in his diaphragm. He missed the rest of the CART year to recover in rehabilitation.

In 1982, he ran on only one Indy car race, the Indianapolis 500 (which was still sanctioned by USAC).  He piloted a new Interscope IP-1 chassis, qualifying 9th and leading several laps before crashing out on lap 62 when running 5th.  The rest of the year he raced only sports cars.

Ongais next drove in CART during the 1983 CART/PPG World Series season, first appearing at the 1983 Indianapolis 500.  He initially drove the #65 Interscope Racing March 83C-Chevrolet V6, however, that car was replaced with the #25 March 83C-Cosworth DFX.  Ongais started in 21st place and retired with mechanical problems. For the next seven races, Ongais replaced an injured Johnny Rutherford at Patrick Racing, who had been driving the #40 Sea Ray Boats Wildcat Mk 9-Cosworth DFX. Later in the season, Interscope Racing set up a partnership between themselves and Patrick Racing giving Patrick March 83C-Cosworth DFXs. Ongais scored a best finish of 5th place at the Escort Warning Radars 200 at Mid-Ohio Sports Car Course. He finished the season in 20th place in points.
 

For the 1984 season Ongais took over as owner of Interscope Racing fielding the #25 Interscope Racing March 84C-Cosworth DFX. Ongais finished in 3rd place at the Detroit News Grand Prix at Michigan International Speedway. He also finished in 10th place in points.

For the 1985 season Ongais scored a best finish of 6th at the Beatrice Indy Challenge at Tamiami Park and finished in 24th place in points.
Ongais also survived a spectacular barrel roll at the Michigan 500 at Michigan International Speedway when he ran into the slower car of Phil Krueger on the backstretch.

For the 1986 season Ongais only ran the 1986 Indianapolis 500 for Interscope Racing. Fielding the #25 GM Goodwrench/Panavision March 86C-Buick V6, Ongais dropped out with a mechanical failure.

For the 1987 season Interscope Racing teamed up with Team Penske getting Ongais in the #25 Panavision Penske PC-16-Ilmor-Chevrolet Indy V8 for the Indianapolis 500, however Ongais crashed in practice and suffered a concussion. The car went to Al Unser Sr who went on to win a record-tying 4th Indianapolis 500.
Ongais later attempted to race at the Marlboro 500 at Michigan International Speedway, the Nissan Indy Challenge at Tamiami Park, and the Bosch Spark Plug Grand Prix at Nazareth Speedway. He would retire at Michigan and Miami and fail to qualify at Nazareth.

IndyCar
After a 9-year hiatus from racing, Ongais was asked by John Menard to fill in for Scott Brayton who was killed during Friday Practice for the 1996 Indianapolis 500. Under qualifying rules he had to start 33rd.  He was the oldest driver to compete in that field, at age 54. Ongais finished 7th, having the best car early in the race. He ran his last Indy Car race the next year, in the Indy 200 at Walt Disney World, with Chitwood Motorsports, where he finished 13th. In 1998 he attempted to qualify for the Indianapolis 500 with Team Pelfrey but was unable to do so when he suffered a concussion after a crash.

Awards
 He was inducted in the Motorsports Hall of Fame of America in 2000.
 On the National Hot Rod Association Top 50 Drivers, 1951-2000, he was ranked 39th.
 He was inducted into the Hawaii Sports Hall of Fame in 2001.

Personal life
Ongais was notoriously reclusive and a private man, rarely giving interviews and revealing little or no details of his life outside of racing. Roger Penske, while employing Ongais for the 1987 Indy 500, was unable to get the racer to speak to the press, and said of him - "His whole heart is in racing, that's his life" Jim Chapman, race director at Interscope Racing stated "Nobody really knew much about him — where he lived, his family, stuff like that". Chapman did state that well into their relationship he learned Ongais was married and had a son. 

Ongais died from congestive heart failure in Anaheim Hills, California, on February 26, 2022, at the age of 79. His death was announced by the Indianapolis Motor Speedway two days later. His former Indy car competitors remembered him well after his passing, with Mario Andretti calling him “that quiet lion.”

Racing record

Complete Formula One results
(key)

American Open-Wheel racing results
(key) (Races in bold indicate pole position)

USAC

PPG Indycar Series
(key) (Races in bold indicate pole position)

 1 Injured, replaced by Al Unser

Indy Racing League

Indianapolis 500

 1 Al Unser succeeded Ongais as driver in the car; Unser won the Indianapolis 500 with a March-Cosworth that had been a show car.
 2 After Scott Brayton was killed in a practice crash with a backup car, Ongais drove the car Brayton qualified on the pole; under USAC rules, the car had to start last.

24 Hours of Le Mans results

References

External links
F1 Rejects profile

1942 births
2022 deaths
24 Hours of Daytona drivers
24 Hours of Le Mans drivers
American Formula One drivers
Ensign Formula One drivers
Champ Car drivers
Dragster drivers
IndyCar Series drivers
Indianapolis 500 drivers
Trans-Am Series drivers
Racing drivers from Hawaii
People from Maui
Military personnel from Hawaii
Native Hawaiian sportspeople
International Motorsports Hall of Fame inductees
International Race of Champions drivers
World Sportscar Championship drivers
Team Pelfrey drivers
Team Penske drivers
Team LeMans drivers